A pupa is the life stage of some insects undergoing transformation between immature and mature stages.

Pupa may also refer to:
Pupa (gastropod), a genus of small sea snails
Pupa (Hasidic dynasty), in Judaism
Pupa (manga), a horror manga series 
Alba Encarnación (1956–2012), nicknamed "Pupa", a Puerto Rican community activist
Metal Gear PUPA, an AI weapon and minor antagonist in the stealth video game Metal Gear Solid: Peace Walker
pupa, a Polish profanity

See also
Pápa, Hungary